Kevin Ojinga Kaala is a Ugandan politician and woman member of parliament. In 2021, she was elected as a woman representative in parliament for Palisa district during the 2021 Uganda general elections.

She is a member of the ruling National Resistance Movement political party.

In the eleventh parliament, she serves on the Committee on Gender, Labour and Social Development.

See also 
 List of members of the eleventh Parliament of Uganda
 Faith Alupo 
National Resistance Movement 
Paliisa District 
Member of Parliament 
Parliament of Uganda

References

External links 

 Website of the Parliament of Uganda

National Resistance Movement politicians
Women members of the Parliament of Uganda
Members of the Parliament of Uganda
21st-century Ugandan women politicians
21st-century Ugandan politicians
Pallisa District
Living people
Year of birth missing (living people)
Teso people